Margit Otto-Crépin (19 February 1945 – 19 April 2020) was a German-born French equestrian. She won a silver medal at 1988 Summer Olympics in Seoul, behind Nicole Uphoff. Born in Germany, she adopted French nationality in 1971.

Otto-Crépin died in Hamburg on 19 April 2020 at age 75 following an illness.

References

External links

1945 births
2020 deaths
Olympic silver medalists for France
Equestrians at the 1984 Summer Olympics
Equestrians at the 1988 Summer Olympics
Equestrians at the 1992 Summer Olympics
Equestrians at the 1996 Summer Olympics
Medalists at the 1988 Summer Olympics
Olympic equestrians of France
French female equestrians
French dressage riders
German emigrants to France
Olympic medalists in equestrian
Sportspeople from Saarbrücken